Peter Reed Morrison (11 November 1919, Washington, DC – 22 March 2019) was a professor of animal physiology and a Guggenheim Fellow for the academic year 1954–1955.

Early life 
Morrison graduated in 1940 with a B.S. from Swarthmore College and graduated in 1947 with a Ph.D. from Harvard University. He became a physiology and biology professor at the University of Wisconsin–Madison. He was also a professor of zoophysiology at the University of Alaska Fairbanks (UAF) from 1963 to 1974. Since then he retired as professor emeritus. He was also the director of UAF's Institute of Arctic Biology from 1966 to 1974.

Selected publications

Patents
 Ferry, J.D. and Morrison, P.R., 1950. Fibrin clots and methods for preparing the same. U.S. Patent 2,533,004.
 Ferry, J.D. and Morrison, P.R., Research Corp, 1951. Methods of forming shaped fibrin products. U.S. Patent 2,576,006.

References

1919 births
2019 deaths
American physiologists
Swarthmore College alumni
Harvard University alumni
University of Wisconsin–Madison faculty
University of Alaska Fairbanks faculty